The Rhodesia Railways 20th class, later Zambia Railways and National Railways of Zimbabwe 20th classes, were among the largest and most powerful steam locomotives in the southern hemisphere.

With 61 locomotives built, they were the fourth largest class of Garratt locomotive built – after the South African Railways class GMA, (120), the Rhodesia Railways 15th class, (74) and the South African Railways class GF (65).

Design
The locomotives have a 4-8-2+2-8-4 of "Double Mountain" wheel arrangement. This arrangement was also used by most other large Garratts.

The 20th class was the first and only class of Rhodesia Railways locomotives to be fitted with mechanical stokers. Other technical features included bar frames and thermic syphons.

The later locomotives were classified as 20A class; the main difference being that the 20ths' inside and outside trailing wheels were of the same size, on the 20A, the inside trailing wheels diameter had been increased in size. The 20As were also heavier.

The 20th class also had the round-ended bunkers characteristic of late Garratts.

The early years
The initial use of the 20th class was ill-fated. The locomotives were plagued with teething troubles including cracks in the locomotives' frames and fireboxes. Unlike the South African Railways' GMA, which had cast steel frames, the 20th had conventional fabricated bar frames.

Two locomotives were scrapped very early due to accident damage. Strangely, they were the first (700) and the last (760) built.

Apart from these problems, the locomotives met all expectations. They were by far the most powerful locomotives on the Rhodesia Railways, and were rated to pull  up a 1.55% (1 in 64) incline.

Later service
In 1964, Zambia took over the operation of railways in its territory. This included the transfer of 80–90 locomotives – about half of them 20th and 20A class locomotives. This left only fifteen 20ths in [Southern] Rhodesia. They later re-acquired four from Zambia Railways when the latter dieselised.

These nineteen locomotives were 705, 707, 709, 710, 714, 716, 717 and 718 (20th) and 723, 724, 726, 727, 729, 738, 746, 747, 749, 753 and 756 (20A) were mainly used in the transportation of coal between Thomson Junction to Bulawayo and Victoria Falls.

In Zambia, the 20th class was replaced by diesels and retired by about 1970.

By June 1975, there were only 18 in service in Rhodesia, all allocated to Bulawayo.

In 1979 / 1980 Zambia briefly placed four back into service due to an oil shortage. One ran with "ZR" painted in large letters on the tender.

Rebuilding
In 1978 Rhodesia Railways started a rebuilding program for its steam locomotive fleet. Between 1980 and 1983 the remaining Garratt locomotives were completely overhauled and had some modernisation, including the installation of roller bearings. The work was undertaken by private companies, especially the RESSCO works in Bulawayo.

Work on the first two was completed in 1980, although it was April 1983 before they were all dealt with.

As part of the rebuilding programme, the locomotives' running numbers were consolidated into two blocks: 730–737 (20th) and 740–750 (20A). Three locomotives kept their old numbers: 746, 747, and 749. At the same time, the locomotives received names; the locally cast nameplates were applied to the cabside above the numberplate.

Post rebuilding service

All the rebuilt 20th and 20A locomotives were allocated to Bulawayo.

Due to the continuing difficult economic situation in Zimbabwe, the rebuilt steam locomotives remained in service longer than originally planned.

Finally, in the early 1990s, new diesels were ordered and the locomotives were systematically withdrawn as they became due for general overhaul. All were withdrawn from general service by 1994.

All those allocated to Bulawayo with the exception of 730/740/742/749 (retained for museum activity and spare parts) were then put up for tender and scrapped as part of the contract to purchase Canadian diesel locomotives. 736 was later saved, See below.

Preservation
These locomotives survive as of February 2019.

708 is in the Railway Museum of Livingstone
730 (formerly No. 705) belongs to the Bulawayo Railway Museum where it is on display.  It was last steamed in 2004.
736 was purchased by tender by the author, A.D. (Dusty) Durrant for US$24,000. It was then stored at Bulawayo Railway Museum. Upon his death in 1999 it was willed to the museum where it remains on display.
740 is still in use as a stationary boiler at Bulawayo steam shed (January 2019)
742 remains dumped at Bulawayo Steam Shed
741 is plinthed at the station in Ndola
749 remains dumped at Bulawayo Steam Shed
758 is plinthed at the station in Kitwe

References

Notes

Bibliography

External links

Steam locomotives of Rhodesia
Steam locomotives of Zimbabwe
Steam locomotives of Zambia
4-8-2+2-8-4 locomotives
Garratt locomotives
Beyer, Peacock locomotives
Cape gauge railway locomotives
Railway locomotives introduced in 1954